Soft Shell is an unincorporated community within Knott County, Kentucky, United States.

History
A post office called Soft Shell was established in 1926, and remained in operation until it was discontinued in 1985. Soft Shell was originally built up chiefly by "soft shell" Old Regular Baptists, hence the name.

References

Unincorporated communities in Knott County, Kentucky
Unincorporated communities in Kentucky